Shengqu Games is a publisher and operator of online games based in Shanghai, China. Founded in 1999 as Shanda Interactive Entertainment Limited, it spun off from Shanda Interactive in 2009 and is currently owned by Zhejiang Century Huatong. Shanda's published and operated games include AION, MapleStory, The World of Legend, The Age, Magical Land, Ragnarok Online,  Dungeons & Dragons Online, Crazy Arcade, GetAmped and Final Fantasy XIV (in mainland China) among others.

History
Shanda Interactive Entertainment Limited was founded in December 1999 by Chen Tianqiao, Chrissy Luo, and Chen Danian. In September 2001, Shanda published its first game, The Legend of Mir 2, which was licensed from a Korean company, WeMade Soft. In 2003, a dispute over profit sharing caused the relationship to fracture between Shanda and WeMade. No longer able to operate The Legend of Mir 2, Shanda developed the game The World of Legend, which began operation in June 2003.  Shanda transferred all user data from The Legend of Mir 2 into the new game, promising its customers that their character, points, armors and weapons would remain the same.  WeMade Entertainment deemed The World of Legend to be a copy of Mir 2 and sued Shanda for copyright infringement in October 2003. After a prolonged legal battle, the two companies reached a settlement on April 26, 2009. By October 2004, Shanda operated eight games and was the largest online game company in China, hosting 1.2 million simultaneous players.

By June 2008, Shanda Games Limited had become a business unit of Shanda Interactive. In 2009, Shanda Interactive spun off Shanda Games in the largest IPO in the United States that year,  raising US$1.04 billion. At the time, Shanda Games provided 77 percent of Shanda Interactive's revenue. Shanda Group founder Tianqiao Chen subsequently sold his stake in Shanda Games in 2014. In 2017, the Shanda Games brand was acquired by Zhejiang Century Huatong Group.

On March 30, 2019, following a buyout by Zhejiang Century Huatong Group, Shanda Games changed their name to Shengqu Games.

Subsidiaries and sub-organization
"Aurora Technology" and "Eyedentity Games" are subsidiary of "Shengqu Games" company. "Actoz Soft" is sub-organization.

Products

Video games

Bomb and Bubble
Company of Heroes Online (MMO real-time strategy computer game)
Chinese Heroes (online video game)
Dragon Ball Online
Dragon Nest
Dungeons & Dragons Online
Fallout Shelter Online
Final Fantasy XIV Online
GetAmped
LaTale
Magical Land
MapleStory
Ragnarok Online
RWBY
Shanda Rich Man
Super Star, First Online Karaoke Game
The Age
The Legend of Mir 2 (licensed from WeMade Soft)
The Sign
The World of Legend
Three Kingdoms
Borderlands Online

Hardware
Ez Station, game console
Ez MINI, handheld game console

See also

Online gaming in China
List of game companies in Singapore
List of video game developers
List of video game publishers

References

External links 
 ShandaGames.com (Chinese)
 Shanda Games Online (Chinese)
 Shanda - English

Video game companies established in 1999
Video game companies of China
Companies based in Shanghai
Video game development companies
Video game publishers
Companies formerly listed on the Nasdaq
Chinese brands
Chinese companies established in 1999